Sergiu Oleinic (born 25 December 1985) is a Moldovan-born Portuguese judoka. He competed at the 2016 Summer Olympics in Rio de Janeiro, in the men's 66 kg. 

At club level, he represents Sporting CP.

References

External links
 
 

1985 births
Living people
Portuguese male judoka
Olympic judoka of Portugal
Judoka at the 2016 Summer Olympics
European Games competitors for Portugal
Judoka at the 2015 European Games
Judoka at the 2019 European Games
Portuguese people of Moldovan descent